The Ambassador of the United States to Barbados, the Eastern Caribbean, and the OECS is the official title of the U.S. Ambassador to several island nations of the Caribbean. The ambassador concurrently represents the United States to Antigua and Barbuda, Barbados, Dominica, Grenada, St. Kitts and Nevis, St. Lucia, and St. Vincent and the Grenadines. The ambassador is resident at the U.S. Embassy in Bridgetown, Barbados and is also accredited to the Organization of Eastern Caribbean States (OECS).

Larry Leon Palmer, a former ambassador to Honduras, was appointed to the post in 2012.

For the individual posts, see:
United States Ambassador to Antigua and Barbuda (established 1981)
United States Ambassador to Barbados (established 1966)
United States Ambassador to Dominica (established 1979)
United States Ambassador to Grenada (established 1975)
United States Ambassador to Saint Kitts and Nevis (established 1984)
United States Ambassador to Saint Lucia (established 1983)
United States Ambassador to Saint Vincent and the Grenadines (established 1981)

See also
United States Consulate General Curaçao

References

.
Organisation of Eastern Caribbean States
.
Barbados
United States